is a multi-purpose stadium in the Edogawa area of Tokyo, Japan. The stadium looks the same as many multi-purpose stadiums of its era in Japan. The stadium seats about 7,000 and is mainly used for football (soccer) and rugby union but features a broad running track for track and field events.

Its main tenant is Kubota Spears Funabashi Tokyo Bay of the Japan Rugby League One. It served as home to Sagawa Express Tokyo until 2006.

In addition to other sports, the stadium hosted the Women's Lacrosse World Cup in 1997.

Facilities
 Four floodlights
 All-weather track of 400 m x 8 lanes, 3,000 m obstacle course etc.
 Natural turf field (105 x 70 m for soccer, lacrosse and rugby)
 Scoreboard (electric)

Access
 15 minutes' walk from Nishi-Kasai Station on the Tokyo Metro Tōzai Line.
 25 minutes' walk from Kasai-Rinkai Park Station on the Keiyō Line.
 Toei Buses also go to the stadium.

External links
  (in Japanese)

Edogawa, Tokyo
Football venues in Japan
Sports venues in Tokyo
Athletics (track and field) venues in Japan
Rugby union stadiums in Japan
Lacrosse venues
FC Tokyo
Multi-purpose stadiums in Japan
Sports venues completed in 1984
1984 establishments in Japan